dotCMS is an open source content management system (CMS) written in Java for managing content and content driven sites and applications.

Architecture
 Java based
 API Based Content Store 
 Hybrid CMS (API First CMS)
 Provides "Content as a Service"
 Elasticsearch for all Content and Documents - external as of 5.3.0
 Cloud or On Premises 
 RESTful Content Searching and Access
 Remote & Static Publishing

Source Code
 Source Code available on GitHub

DotCMS Products 
dotCMS provides a community edition of their content management system that is free to download and use. They also provide an Enterprise edition, which is a SaaS-based product, that you can purchase on an annual or monthly subscription.

License
 dotCMS is dual licensed under the GNU General Public License v3 or as a Commercial license

References

External links

Content management systems
Website management
Free content management systems
Java platform software